The Einasleigh rock dtella (Gehyra einasleighensis) is a species of gecko in the genus Gehyra, native to Queensland in Australia, and first described in 2017.

References

Gehyra
Reptiles described in 2017
Geckos of Australia